James McCarthy may refer to:

 James McCarthy (bishop) (1853–1943), Bishop of Galloway
 James McCarthy (footballer) (born 1990), Ireland international footballer
 James McCarthy (Gaelic footballer) (born 1990), player for Dublin and Ballymun Kickhams
 James McCarthy (oceanographer) (1944–2019), Harvard professor of biological oceanography
 James McCarthy (rugby union), (born 1999), Welsh rugby union player
 James McCarthy (sociologist) (born 1949), president of Suffolk University in Boston, Massachusetts
 James McCarthy (surveyor) (1853–1919), Irish surveyor who mapped the boundaries of Siam in the 19th century
 James F. McCarthy, college football coach
 James Francis McCarthy (born 1942), American Roman Catholic bishop
 James P. McCarthy (born 1935), U.S. Air Force general
 James William McCarthy (1872–1939), U.S. federal judge
 James Joseph McCarthy (1817–1882), Irish architect
 Babe McCarthy (James H. McCarthy, 1923–1975), American basketball coach
 Sir James McCarthy (died 1824), governor of Cape Coast Castle
 James McCarthy, villain of the Sherlock Holmes story The Boscombe Valley Mystery

See also
James MacCarthy (1945–2019), Irish artist
 Jim McCarthy (disambiguation)